Yangihayot is an urban-type settlement in Tashkent Region, Uzbekistan. The town population in 1989 was 8417 people. It is part of the city Nurafshon.

References

Populated places in Tashkent Region
Urban-type settlements in Uzbekistan